The Trail Ridge Road/Beaver Meadow National Scenic Byway is a  All-American Road and Colorado Scenic and Historic Byway located in Rocky Mountain National Park in Larimer and Grand counties, Colorado, USA. The byway consists of the  Trail Ridge Road (U.S. Highway 34) and the connecting  Beaver Meadow Road (U.S. Highway 36). With a high point at  elevation, Trail Ridge Road is the highest continuous paved road in North America. The higher portion of Trail Ridge Road is closed from October to May. The Rocky Mountain National Park Administration Building is a National Historic Landmark.

The byway connects with the  Peak to Peak Scenic Byway at Estes Park and the  Colorado River Headwaters National Scenic Byway at Grand Lake.

Route

Gallery

See also

History Colorado
List of scenic byways in Colorado
Scenic byways in the United States

Notes

References

External links

Rocky Mountain National Park
Trail Ridge Road
America's Byways
America's Scenic Byways: Colorado
Colorado Department of Transportation
Colorado Scenic & Historic Byways Commission
Colorado Scenic & Historic Byways
Colorado Travel Map
Colorado Tourism Office
History Colorado

Colorado Scenic and Historic Byways
All-American Roads
All-American Roads in Colorado
Rocky Mountain National Park
Transportation in Colorado
Transportation in Grand County, Colorado
Transportation in Larimer County, Colorado
Tourist attractions in Colorado
Tourist attractions in Grand County, Colorado
Tourist attractions in Larimer County, Colorado
U.S. Route 34
U.S. Route 36